As of March 2023 Azul Brazilian Airlines and its subsidiary Azul Conecta (2F) operate scheduled services to the following destinations:

References

Azul Brazilian Airlines
Azul Brazilian Airlines